Giuseppe Milano (26 September 1887 – 13 May 1971) was an Italian footballer and manager who played as a midfielder. At club level, he spent his entire career with Pro Vercelli. With the Italy national football team, he competed in the men's tournament at the 1912 Summer Olympics at international level.

References

External links
 

1887 births
1971 deaths
Italian footballers
Association football midfielders
Italy international footballers
Olympic footballers of Italy
Footballers at the 1912 Summer Olympics
Sportspeople from Mantua
Footballers from Lombardy